The list of ship launches in 1733 includes a chronological list of some ships launched in 1733.


References

1733
Ship launches